Brian Mullooly (born 21 February 1935) is a former Irish Fianna Fáil party politician known for serving as Cathaoirleach in November 1996, and from 1997 to 2002.

He was born in Strokestown, County Roscommon, and educated at Summerhill College, Sligo and at St. Patricks Teacher Training College in Dublin. He worked as a national school teacher before becoming involved in politics. Mullooly served in Seanad Éireann for over twenty years, holding the post of Cathaoirleach from 16 November to 27 November 1996 and from 1997 to 2002.

References

1935 births
Living people
Fianna Fáil senators
Cathaoirligh of Seanad Éireann
Members of the 15th Seanad
Members of the 16th Seanad
Members of the 17th Seanad
Members of the 18th Seanad
Members of the 19th Seanad
Members of the 20th Seanad
Members of the 21st Seanad
Local councillors in County Roscommon
Politicians from County Roscommon
Alumni of St Patrick's College, Dublin